Henborth is a Site of Special Scientific Interest (or SSSI) in Anglesey, North Wales. It has been designated as a Site of Special Scientific Interest since October 1989 in an attempt to protect its fragile geological elements. The site has an area of 10.96 hectares and is managed by Natural Resources Wales.

Type
This site is designated due to its geological qualities. In Wales, geological sites range from quarries to rocky outcrops and massive sea-cliffs. 30% of SSSIs in Wales are notified for geological and geomorphological features.

See also
List of Sites of Special Scientific Interest in Isle of Anglesey

References

External links
Natural Resources Wales website

Sites of Special Scientific Interest on Anglesey